Fevzi Elmas (born 9 June 1983) is a Turkish former professional footballer who played as a goalkeeper.

Career
Formerly, he played for Çanakkale Dardanelspor, Sakaryaspor, Galatasaray and Antalyaspor.

Elmas transferred to Antalyaspor from Galatasaray in July 2007.  He played in one league match for Galatasaray in the Turkish Süper Lig during the 2004–05 season, appearing as a second-half substitute.

References

External links

1983 births
People from Biga, Çanakkale
Living people
Turkish footballers
Turkey youth international footballers
Turkey under-21 international footballers
Association football goalkeepers
Dardanelspor footballers
Sakaryaspor footballers
Galatasaray S.K. footballers
Antalyaspor footballers
Orduspor footballers
Şanlıurfaspor footballers
Adana Demirspor footballers
Giresunspor footballers
Süper Lig players
TFF First League players